The Arizona Complex League Reds are a Rookie-level affiliate of the Cincinnati Reds, competing in the Arizona Complex League of Minor League Baseball. The team plays its home games at Goodyear Ballpark in Goodyear, Arizona. The team is composed mainly of players who are in their first year of professional baseball either as draftees or non-drafted free agents from the United States, Canada, Dominican Republic, Venezuela, and other countries.

History
The Cincinnati Reds previously fielded a Rookie-level team in the Gulf Coast League (GCL) during three tenures (1968–1973, 1984–1990, and 1999–2009) known as the Gulf Coast League Reds. During 2004–2009, the team played home games at Ed Smith Stadium in Sarasota, Florida.

In 2010, when the major-league Reds moved their spring training headquarters from Florida to Arizona, the Rookie-level team also relocated and became members of the Arizona League (AZL), and were renamed as the Arizona League Reds. The team has competed in Arizona since then. Prior to the 2021 season, the Arizona League was renamed as the Arizona Complex League (ACL).

Roster

Season-by-season

Notable players
Notable players for the team have included:

 Jared Burton
Noah Davis
 Yasmani Grandal
 Michael Lorenzen
 Kyle Lotzkar
 Donald Lutz
 Jon Moscot
 Nefi Ogando
 Wandy Peralta
 Denis Phipps
 Josh Ravin
 Steve Selsky
 Brett Tomko
 Zack Weiss

References

External links
 Official website

Arizona Complex League teams
Professional baseball teams in Arizona
Cincinnati Reds minor league affiliates
Baseball teams established in 1968
1968 establishments in Florida